Savage Garden is the debut studio album by Australian pop duo Savage Garden. It was released on 4 March 1997 in Australia by Columbia Records and Roadshow Music. The album won the award for Highest Selling Album at the 12th Annual ARIA Music Awards, selling more than 12 million copies worldwide, according to Billboard magazine.

Background
The band had formed in June 1994: multi-instrumentalist and producer Daniel Jones and vocalist Darren Hayes. In 1995, they entered the studio to work on their debut album with producer, Charles Fisher (Air Supply, Moving Pictures, 1927). After the success of "I Want You", a deal was struck with Columbia Records. The record label's executives sent Darren Hayes and Daniel Jones to Sydney for 8 months, tasking them with writing material. It was there that they would come up with most of the songs for their debut album, including "Truly Madly Deeply", for which Darren Hayes wrote the chorus while dining out in Kings Cross.

In March 1997, the duo's self-titled debut album, Savage Garden, entered the Australian charts at No. 1 and peaked there for a total of 19 weeks. The album was released internationally two weeks later. The album reached No. 3 on the US Billboard 200 and was certified gold by RIAA.

In September, Savage Garden won a record ten ARIA Awards from 13 nominations for the album and associated singles. As of 2005, Savage Garden had been certified diamond in Canada, 12× platinum in Australia, 7× platinum in the US, 2× platinum in New Zealand, Singapore, and in the UK.

The album's track listing varies depending on territory. The original Australian version of the album includes the tracks "Mine" and "All Around Me", which were removed from the international track listing. "Mine" was removed due to concerns held by the record company over the line "crosses and crucifixes", and "All Around Me" was removed for being overtly sexual. The international version adds the track "Promises", which had previously been released in Australia as the B-side to "Truly Madly Deeply". Also, the version of "Truly Madly Deeply" on the international version has a new drum track, compared to the original Australian version, which has drum machine. Thus, this became the hit single version released outside Australia. The track order was also changed to give prominence to the three hit singles, which open the album. The Japanese version of the album uses the international track listing, however, includes "Mine" as a bonus track between "Promises" and "Santa Monica". In support of the group's Asian tour in 1998, a special double-album package was released in the region. The first disc features the international version of the album, and the second disc includes B-sides, remixes and rare tracks. Darren Hayes has noted that the international track listing was not what the band wanted (particularly because Mine was one of his favorite tracks, and because the band had laboured over the track order), but the US record label insisted.

It was thought by many that an arrangement of "A Thousand Words" was later used as the installation music for Microsoft's Windows XP, however that track was actually written by linear media composer Stan LePard around the same time.

Singles
 "I Want You" was released in July 1996 as the group's debut single under Roadshow Music and Warner Music. It peaked at No. 4 on the Australian Recording Industry Association (ARIA) Singles Chart and on the 1996 End of Year Singles Chart, becoming the highest-selling single of 1996 by an Australian artist. On 30 September, they received their first ARIA Award nomination, in the category 'Breakthrough Artist – Single'. Their success garnered interest from international labels and they signed to Columbia Records. "I Want You" was released in North America in February, where it peaked at No. 4 on the United States Billboard Hot 100 and by April had achieved gold status according to Recording Industry Association of America (RIAA). It peaked at No. 1 on the Canadian Singles Chart. "I Want You" was released across Europe in April 1997, reaching No. 11 on the UK Singles Chart.
 "To the Moon and Back" was released in November 1996 in Australia, reaching No. 1 in January 1997. In May 1997, "To the Moon and Back" was the most played song on American radio. The single became the band's most successful chart single in the United Kingdom, peaking at #3 on the UK Singles Chart, after its second release in June 1998.
 "Truly Madly Deeply", the band's third Australian single, was released in March 1997, reaching No. 1 there, and soon became their signature song. By the end of 1997, "Truly Madly Deeply" became the most-played song on American radio, and the only one-sided single to spend a full year in the Top 30 of the Billboard Hot 100. It also replaced Elton John's "Candle in the Wind 1997" at the top of the charts after that song's 14-week run at No. 1. The single became the band's highest-selling single in the UK, selling 645,000 copies after just six months of release.
 "Break Me Shake Me" was released as the album's fourth Australian single in June 1997. It achieved minor success, and thus, was later issued in Europe and Japan in September 1998, complete with a brand new music video. The single was not released in the United Kingdom.
 "Universe" was released as the album's fifth Australian single in October 1997. Exclusively released in Australia, it is one of the band's least-known singles, but is still popular amongst Australian fans.
 "All Around Me" was released as a radio-only single in Australia in January 1998, although around 3000 physical copies were given away via a radio competition and at the band's second massive concert in Brisbane.
 "Santa Monica" was released as a single in Japan in December 1998, accompanied by a video of a live performance of the song at the Hard Rock Cafe. The single was never issued in Australia.
 "Tears of Pearls" was released as the album's final single in May 1999, exclusively in Europe. The single was backed with a music video featuring footage from the group's Future of Earthly Delites tour.

Accolades
This album fetched the duo a record of 10 awards at the ARIA Awards 1997, grabbing Best Album, Best Single, Best Group, Song of the Year, Best Debut Album, Best Independent Release, Best Pop Release and Highest Selling Single award—the most awards ever won by a single act in one year. The following year at the ARIA Awards 1998, the album won two more awards—Highest Selling Album award and Outstanding Achievement Award. In October 2010, Savage Garden was listed in the top 40 in the book, 100 Best Australian Albums. In December of 2021, the album was listed at no. 9 in Rolling Stone Australia’s ‘200 Greatest Albums of All Time’ countdown.

Track listing

B-sides
 "Promises" – B-side to "I Want You" and "Truly Madly Deeply", included on the international version of the album
 "Mine" (later subtitled as "Mine (And You Could Be)") – B-side to "I Want You", included on the album in Australia and Japan, and the bonus remix disc in Asia
 "All Around Me" – B-side to "To the Moon and Back", included on the album in Australia, and the bonus remix disc in Asia
 "Fire Inside the Man" – B-side to "I Want You"
 "Memories Are Designed to Fade" – B-side to "To the Moon and Back"
 "This Side of Me" – B-side to "Truly Madly Deeply" and "Universe"
 "Love Can Move You" – B-side to "Truly Madly Deeply", "Universe" and "Tears of Pearls", included on the bonus remix disc in Asia
 "I'll Bet He Was Cool" – B-side to "Truly Madly Deeply" and "Break Me Shake Me", included on the bonus remix disc in Asia

Personnel
Darren Hayes – lead and background vocals
Daniel Jones – keyboards, sequencing, lead and rhythm guitars, background vocals
Terepai Richmond – drums, percussion
Alex Hewetson – bass
Rex Goh – rhythm and lead guitars
Jackie Orzaczky – strings orchestration and conducting
Written by Darren Hayes and Daniel Jones
Produced by Charles Fisher except "Santa Monica", which is produced by Savage Garden
Vocals arranged by Darren Hayes, Charles Fisher and Jim Bonnefond
Strings arranged by Daniel Jones
Mixed by Chris Lord-Alge except "Truly Madly Deeply", "Tears of Pearls" and "Universe", which were mixed by Mike Pela and "Santa Monica" which was mixed by Oliver Jones.
Mastered by Vlado Meller
Album cover and inside photography of The Garden of Earthly Delights by Yelena Yemchuk
Design by Aimee Macauley

Charts

Weekly charts

Year-end charts

Decade-end charts

Certifications and sales

See also 
 List of best-selling albums in Australia

Notes

1997 debut albums
ARIA Award-winning albums
Savage Garden albums
Soft rock albums by Australian artists
Albums produced by Charles Fisher (producer)
Columbia Records albums